Pseudocercospora gunnerae is a fungal plant pathogen.

See also 
 Pseudocercospora arecacearum
 Pseudocercospora pandoreae

References 

gunnerae
Fungal plant pathogens and diseases